Ketevan "Keti" Topuria (born 9 September 1986), also sometimes known as Keta Topuria, is a Georgian singer and the current lead vocalist for the Kazakh group A-Studio.

Biography 
Topuria's late father, Andro Topuria, was a Georgian crime lord and her mother, Natalia Topuria, is a chemical engineer. They have some Italian and Polish roots.

Topuria has been involved in music since childhood. In 1998, she graduated from Gogi Sudradze Music School in Tbilisi, and in 2003, graduated music school with a specialty in vocals. Also in 2003, Topuria was accepted into the State University of Georgia psychology department.

Personal life 
2013-2017 she was married to businessman Lev Geykhman (born 1974), whom she met 4 years before their wedding. In the summer of 2017, the couple divorced.

Since 2018, lives with Lev Dengov.

Sources

External links
 Official site of A-Studio

21st-century women singers from Georgia (country)
Expatriates from Georgia (country) in Russia
Russian people of Georgian descent
Mingrelians
Georgian people of Italian descent
Georgian people of Polish descent
Living people
1986 births
Musicians from Tbilisi
Naturalised citizens of Russia